The Madagascar lark (Eremopterix hova) is a species of lark in the family Alaudidae endemic to Madagascar.

Taxonomy and systematics
The Madagascar lark was formerly placed within the genus Mirafra until moved to Eremopterix in 2014. Alternate names for the Madagascan lark include: Hova lark, Madagascan bush lark, Madagascar singing bushlark, and Madagascar sparrow lark.

Distribution and habitat 
The range of the Madagascan lark is large, with an estimated global extent of occurrence of greater than 100,000  km2. Its natural habitats are dry savannah and subtropical or tropical dry shrubland.

References

Madagascar lark
Endemic birds of Madagascar
Madagascar lark
Taxonomy articles created by Polbot